Monsignor Raphaël Bayan (28 February 1914 – 21 September 1999) was Armenian Catholic Bishop Emeritus of Iskandariya of the Armenians (Egypt).

Born in Zgharta in 1914, he was ordained on 1 November 1937 as a priest. On 12 December 1958, aged 44, he was appointed as Coadjutor Bishop of Iskandariya of the Armenians and Titular Bishop of Taua. On 6 January 1959 he was ordained Titular Bishop of Taua.

On 2 July 1960 he succeeded as Bishop of Iskandariya of the Armenians, in which capacity he ordained, on 15 August 1965 in Cairo, as a priest the future Patriarch, Nerses Bedros XIX.

Bayan retired at the age of 75 on 9 March 1989, and became Bishop Emeritus. He died on 21 September 1999, aged 85 after having been a priest for more than 60 years and a bishop for 40 years.

External links
http://www.catholic-hierarchy.org/bishop/bbayan.html
http://www.gcatholic.org/dioceses/diocese/iska0.htm

1914 births
1999 deaths
20th-century Armenian Catholic bishops
Members of the Patriarchal Congregation of Bzommar
Participants in the Second Vatican Council
Armenians from the Ottoman Empire
Clergy from Cairo
Eastern Catholic titular bishops
20th-century Eastern Catholic bishops